Nadi is a district within Ba Province, located on the south-west coast of the island of Viti Levu in Fiji. Nadi is well known for its international airport, which long provided a communication link for travellers from North America to Australia and New Zealand. Because of its proximity to the airport and a number of uninhabited tropical islands, tourism is the main industry in the district. The district is served by the town of Nadi which has a population of approximately 12,000. In the rural areas of Nadi most farmers are involved in the sugar cane industry.

Districts of Ba Province